"Only You" is the tenth episode of the first season of the period drama television series The Americans. It originally aired on FX in the United States on April 10, 2013.

Plot
KGB agent Elizabeth Jennings (Keri Russell) finally sees her estranged husband Philip's (Matthew Rhys) motel living arrangements. At FBI headquarters, the agents are mourning the death of their colleague Chris Amador (Maximiliano Hernández). Martha (Alison Wright) tearfully confides in agent Stan Beeman (Noah Emmerich) that she had only just spoken to Amador. Stan, depressed over Amador's death, visits his neighbor Philip late at night in his motel room. He tells Philip about Amador and that he'll find whoever is responsible. Stan declines Philip's offer to drive him home and leaves, sincerely thanking Philip.

KGB employee Nina (Annet Mahendru) confronts her handler Stan about the murder of young KGB official Vlad, whom she considered a friend. Stan (who shot Vlad) denies any knowledge of Vlad's death, but Nina is unconvinced. Philip tells Elizabeth that he learned from Martha that Amador's ring was missing from his body when he was found, and resolves to talk to Gregory (Derek Luke), whose team had handled Amador. Stan finds out that a man who owns a wrecking yard found Amador's ring in a car and tried to pawn it. Stan realizes that Amador left the ring in the trunk of the car in which he was kidnapped so that the FBI would find it.  The wrecking yard owner refuses to say who dropped off the car, but relents when Stan attacks him, saying that the men who dropped it off were black drug dealers who sometimes abandon cars with him.

Elizabeth meets Gregory at a bar, where she tells him about Amador's ring and her separation from Philip. Later, the wrecking yard owner identifies one of the men who dropped off the car in a mug book. Stan realizes that the man is Curtis, who was tailing him and Amador in Philadelphia. Soon afterwards, agents raid Curtis's building and arrest him. Claudia (Margo Martindale) briefs Elizabeth on the situation. Stan threatens Curtis with charges of treason when he refuses to talk and appeals to their common ground as Americans.

The FBI reviews information on Gregory, revealing that the KGB recruited civil rights activists such as him. Claudia tells Gregory he must go with her and that she has planted evidence in his apartment linking him to Amador's murder in order to ensure the FBI won't keep looking long enough to find Philip and Elizabeth. The FBI raids the place, finding Amador's blood on a pair of Gregory's shoes. Claudia tells Philip that they want to send Gregory to Moscow, but Gregory refuses, and Claudia and Philip discuss killing Gregory. Later, Gregory tells Elizabeth to leave Philip and to find someone who loves her for her strength rather than trying to soften her. Gregory and Elizabeth kiss and have sex for the last time.

The next day, Philip prepares to kill Gregory. Gregory tells Elizabeth that he is not moving to Moscow and that he will instead commit suicide by cop. Elizabeth pulls a gun and prepares for the hard task of shooting him; Philip enters, offering to spare her the pain, but she convinces him that Gregory has always kept his word. Gregory makes his way outside, and is soon noticed by a police officer who calls it in. As he is surrounded, he incites a gunfight and is then killed fighting the police. Elizabeth watches the report on the news.

Production
The episode was written by Bradford Winters and directed by Adam Arkin.

Reception
In its original American broadcast on April 10, 2013, "Only You" was watched by 1.50 million viewers, according to Nielsen ratings.

References

External links
 

The Americans (season 1) episodes
2013 American television episodes